Prairie Green Township is one of twenty-six townships in Iroquois County, Illinois, USA.  As of the 2010 census, its population was 183 and it contained 92 housing units.  Prairie Green Township was originally named Prairie Township, and was formed from Stockland Township, originally known as Crab Apple Township, in March 1857. The name was changed to Prairie Green Township in March 1858.

Geography

Unincorporated towns
 Greer at 
 Hallock at 
(This list is based on USGS data and may include former settlements.)

Demographics

School districts
 Hoopeston Area Community Unit School District 11
 Milford Community Consolidated School District 124

The entire township once made up part of the Wellington School District.  The Wellington, IL schools closed in 1987 and later the township was divided between Milford and Hoopeston schools.

Political districts
 Illinois' 15th congressional district
 State House District 105
 State Senate District 53

Religion
Residents of the township have consisted primarily of Christians of the Protestant tradition since the time of the township's founding.  Currently there is one church in Prairie Green Township, the Prairie Green Church of Christ.  Established in 1872 as the Hope Congregation of the Disciples of Christ, it located in Prairie Green Township shortly thereafter.  Since 1957, the church has been located in Greer.  An undenominational body, the church is identified with the Christian Churches and Churches of Christ and currently has approximately 50 active members and adherents.

The United Methodist (formerly Methodist Episcopal) denomination has also had a strong presence within the township since the 1800s.  The Pleasant Hill Methodist Church was once an active congregation in the Northeast part of the township, but closed in the early 1960s.  At that time the majority of members transferred to the Wellington Methodist Church (now Wellington United Methodist Church) in Lovejoy Township.

References
 
 United States Census Bureau 2007 TIGER/Line Shapefiles
 United States National Atlas

External links
 City-Data.com
 Illinois State Archives

Townships in Iroquois County, Illinois
Townships in Illinois